Prabhadevi (Pronunciation: [pɾəbʱaːd̪eʋiː]) is a small up-scale southern neighbourhood of Mumbai, situated between Dadar to the north, Worli to the south and the Arabian Sea to the west. The area derives its name from the 300 year old Prabhavati temple located in the locality. Prabhadevi starts at Sayani Road Junction and ends at Babasaheb Worlikar Chowk.

Landmarks
Prabhadevi is largely a residential area, consisting mostly of newly built apartments and high rises.

One of Prabhadevi's most important landmark is Siddhivinayak Temple, which attracts thousands of devotees every day, Tuesday being the main day of prayer.

Transportation
Numerous BEST buses ply in the Prabhadevi region. Prabadhevi is not directly served by the local train; the nearest station is Prabhadevi on the Western line and Parel on the Central line; which was previously known as Parel-Elphinston Road railway station.

Notable residents
 Kishori Amonkar
 Deepika Padukone
 Ranveer Singh
 Sulochana Latkar 
 Kunal vijaykar 
Anurag vaidya

See also

 Statue of Equality (disambiguation)
 Dadar
 Worli

References

Neighbourhoods in Mumbai